Lanthanum phosphide is an inorganic compound of lanthanum and phosphorus with the chemical formula LaP.

Synthesis
Heating lanthanum metal with excess phosphorus in a vacuum:

 4 La + P4 → 4 LaP

Physical properties
The compound forms black crystals of a cubic system, space group Fm3m, cell parameters a = 0.601 nm, with number of formulas per unit cell Z = 4.

The crystals are very unstable and decompose in the open air.

Chemical properties
Lanthanum phosphide reacts with water, releasing highly toxic phosphine gas:

 LaP + 3H2O → La(OH)3 + PH3

Uses
The compound is a semiconductor used in high power, high frequency applications, and in laser diodes.

Lanthanum polyphosphide
In addition to the simple phosphide, LaP, lanthanum and phosphorus can also form phosphide-rich compounds such as LaP5 and LaP7.

References

Phosphides
Lanthanum compounds
Semiconductors
Rock salt crystal structure